John Sieg (February 3, 1903 – October 15, 1942) was an American-born German Communist railroad worker, journalist and resistance fighter, who publicized Nazi atrocities through the underground Communist press and fought against National Socialism in the German Resistance. He was a key member of the anti-fascist resistance group that was later called the Red Orchestra by the Gestapo.

Biography 

John Sieg was born in Detroit, Michigan, the son of a mechanic. After the death of his father in 1912, he lived with his grandfather in Germany and became a German citizen in 1920.

In the beginning of the 1920s, Sieg went to school to become a teacher, but when his grandfather died in 1923, he had to quit. He returned to Detroit and met his future wife, Sophie, in 1924, while working as a college intern. He stayed in the United States until February 1928, when Sieg and his wife returned to Germany and he became a freelance author in Berlin.

He began writing articles for Die Tat, a newspaper published by Adam Kuckhoff. After joining the Communist Party of Germany that same year, he began to write for the arts section of the KPD newspaper, Die Rote Fahne and he got to know Wilhelm Guddorf and Martin Weise.

He was arrested by the Sturmabteilung (storm troopers) in March 1933 and held till June. Upon his release, he began working with the Communist Resistance in the Berlin suburb of Neukölln, becoming the focal point of several groups. He had close contact with Arvid Harnack and Kuckhoff. He took part in leafletting campaigns and shared political information. In 1937, he got a job with the Deutsche Reichsbahn, eventually working as a signaller at the S-Bahn station at Papestraße. As a railroad employee, Sieg was able to make use of work-related travel and free travel to build connections with other Resistance groups, such as the one organized around Bernhard Bästlein. He worked with Herbert Grasse, Otto Grabowski, and the Saefkow-Jacob-Bästlein Organization to produce the newspaper, Die Innere Front (The Internal Front). He was a core member of the Rote Kapelle, along with Guddorf and Kuckhoff.

He was arrested on 11 October 1942 and was taken to the Gestapo prison on Prinz-Albrecht-Straße, where he endured intensive interrogations and abuse. The previous spring, he had confided to a friend that if he were ever arrested, he would commit suicide rather than risk betraying friends. On 15 October 1942, following severe mistreatment, he hanged himself in his cell. Sieg's wife, Sophie, was also arrested in October 1942. Without trial, she was sent to Ravensbrück concentration camp in 1943. She was liberated by the Red Army in 1945.

Legacy 

A street in an area of new construction on Frankfurter Allee-Süd in Berlin-Lichtenberg was named after John Sieg on June 22, 1972.

See also 
 List of Germans who resisted Nazism

Further reading 
 Hans Coppi, Jr., Jürgen Danyel and Johannes Tuchel. Die Rote Kapelle im Widerstand gegen den Nationalsozialismus. Hentric, Berlin 1994,  
 Alfred Gottwaldt. Innere Front. Erinnerungen an John Sieg, Reichsbahngehilfe und Widerstandskämpfer. In: Eisenbahn Geschichte, No. 26 (February–March 2008) pp. 57–59 
 Regina Griebel, Marlies Coburger, Heinrich Scheel. Erfasst? Das Gestapo-Album zur Roten Kapelle. Audioscop, Halle/S. 1992,  
 Gert Rosiejka. Die Rote Kapelle. "Landesverrat" als antifaschistischer Widerstand. ergebnisse, Hamburg 1986,  
 Helmut Schmidt (Ed.) John Sieg. Einer von Millionen spricht. Dietz Verlag Berlin 1989,

References

External links 
 Museum Lichterberg, Berlin Retrieved April 7, 2010 

1903 births
1942 suicides
German people of World War II
German resistance members
People condemned by Nazi courts
German communists
Red Orchestra (espionage)
Communists in the German Resistance
Spies who died in prison custody
American emigrants to Germany
Suicides by hanging in Germany
People who committed suicide in prison custody